Since 2013, radio coverage of the Cleveland Browns professional football team has originated from flagship stations WKNR, WKRK-FM and WNCX. Games are covered on-site by Jim Donovan, the team's lead announcer since its 1999 resumption as an expansion team. Color commentator Nathan Zegura and sideline analyst/reporter Je'Rod Cherry assist Donovan in the game coverage.

WEWS (channel 5) is the preseason TV home of the Browns, with veteran national announcer Chris Rose (play by play), 10-time Pro Bowl left tackle Joe Thomas (color commentary) and sideline reporter Aditi Kinkhabwala comprising the broadcast team.

Radio 

The following is a list of sportscasters who have covered the Browns over the radio throughout the team's history (including its first four seasons as a member of the All-American Football Conference and original incarnation in the NFL from 1950 to 1995), split by play-by-play and commentary. The team began using radio sideline reporters upon its return to the NFL in 1999. Gold shading indicates championship season.

Television

Preseason TV

Notes

References

External links 
ClevelandBrowns.com: TV & Radio Programming

 
broadcasters
Lists of National Football League announcers by team
Hughes Television Network